Adriana DeMeo (born 1981) is an American actress. She is known for playing Lucy in the CBS television drama series Without a Trace.

Early life
Adriana DeMeo was born in Brooklyn, New York. Her parents moved to Brooklyn from a small town in Italy. She attended a special two-year performing arts program at Howell High School in New Jersey. DeMeo graduated from Rutgers University.

Career 
Her first on-screen appearance was a guest role as Marianna in an episode of the police procedural television drama series Law & Order: Criminal Intent, soon followed by a three-episode appearance in the final season of The Practice. DeMeo's film work includes roles in Killer Movie (2008), The Wannabe (2015) and The Brooklyn Banker (2016). She joined the cast of CBS show Without a Trace, playing Lucy. She also appeared in episodes of Bones; Boston Legal; Veronica Mars; 30 Rock; Castle; The Carrie Diaries; and Blue Bloods.

She is the lead singer of a rock band called Fuckery.

Filmography

References

External links

1981 births
American film actresses
American television actresses
Howell High School (New Jersey) alumni
Living people
Rutgers University alumni
Place of birth missing (living people)
21st-century American women